Arthur Ralph Douglas Elliot (17 December 184612 February 1923) was a British journalist and Liberal Unionist politician.

Background and education
Elliot was the second son of Emma Eleanor Elizabeth (née Hyslop) and William Elliot-Murray-Kynynmound, 3rd Earl of Minto. Gilbert Elliot-Murray-Kynynmound, 4th Earl of Minto, was his elder brother and the Honourable Hugh Elliot his younger brother. 

At age four his leg was amputated as the result of a fall. 

He was educated at the University of Edinburgh and Trinity College, Cambridge.

Political career
Elliot was elected to the House of Commons for Roxburghshire in 1880 as a Liberal, and held that seat until 1892, having joined the Liberal Unionists when the Irish Home Rule split the Liberal Party in 1886. After his defeat by the Liberal candidate at the 1892 general election, he did not stand again in Roxburghshire, and at the 1895 general election he stood in the City of Durham, losing by 3 votes to the sitting Liberal MP, Matthew Fowler. After Fowler's death in 1898, Elliot won the resulting by-election, though with a margin of only 65 votes.

He was re-elected in Durham at the 1900 general election with a much bigger majority, but his support of free trade then brought him into conflict with the Durham Constitutional Association (the local Conservative and Liberal Unionist organisation), some of whose members were backing John Waller Hills as an alternative for the next election. Elliot resigned from the Durham Constitutional Association in February 1905, and contested the general election in January 1906 as a "Free Trade" Liberal candidate, with the support of the local Liberal Association. In a straight contest between Elliot and Hills (who had been adopted as the Conservative and Liberal Unionist candidate), Hills took the seat with 60% of the votes. He served briefly as Financial Secretary to the Treasury under Arthur Balfour between April and October 1903. Apart from his political career he was also editor of the Edinburgh Review.

Family
Elliot married Madeline Harriet Dagmar, daughter of Sir Charles Lister Ryan, in 1888. They had two sons, of whom only the youngest reached adulthood. Madeline died in January 1906. Elliot lived for many years in Freshwater, Isle of Wight and remained a widower until his death in February 1923, aged 76.

References

External links 
 
1903 illustrated article with photo of Arthur Elliot

1846 births
1923 deaths
Politicians from London
Younger sons of earls
Scottish Liberal Party MPs
Liberal Unionist Party MPs for Scottish constituencies
Liberal Unionist Party MPs for English constituencies
UK MPs 1880–1885
UK MPs 1885–1886
UK MPs 1886–1892
UK MPs 1895–1900
UK MPs 1900–1906
Alumni of the University of Edinburgh
British amputees
Members of the Parliament of the United Kingdom for City of Durham